Desert Legion is a 1953 American adventure film directed by Joseph Pevney and starring Alan Ladd.

Plot
Ladd stars as a soldier in the French Foreign Legion who stumbles across a lost city in the desert mountains of Algeria in North Africa.

Cast
 Alan Ladd as Paul Lartal
 Richard Conte as Crito 
 Arlene Dahl as Morjana
 Akim Tamiroff as Pvt. Plevko
 Oscar Beregi as Khalil (as Oscar Berefi)
 Leon Askin as Major Vasil
 Anthony Caruso as Lt. Messaoud
 George J. Lewis as Lt. Lopez
 Sujata Rubener as Dancer (as Sujata)
 Asoka Rubener as Dancer (as Asoka)

Production
The film was made by Universal Pictures, and based on a 1927 novel The Demon Caravan by Georges Arthur Surdez.

It was Alan Ladd's first film for Universal since becoming a star. It was a one-picture deal and gave Ladd a percentage of the profits, a relatively novel thing at the time. (He split profits with the studio 50–50.) Joseph Pevney was assigned to direct.

Ladd had broken his hand during a fight scene towards the end of his most recent film The Iron Mistress, but recovered to begin work on Desert Legion on 7 July 1952.

Akim Tamiroff joined the support cast. It was his first Hollywood film in three years.

References

External links
 
 
 

1953 films
1953 adventure films
Films set in Algeria
Universal Pictures films
American black-and-white films
Films based on military novels
Films directed by Joseph Pevney
Films about the French Foreign Legion
Films set in deserts
Films scored by Frank Skinner
1950s English-language films